Sillä siisti (That's Clean) is the Finnish version of the British television show How Clean is Your House?. It broadcast on MTV3.

External links
Official website

Finnish reality television series